The South Wales Business School is the Business School of the University of South Wales and was established in 2013. The school is currently situated in the Faculty of Creative Industries. It has expertise up to professorial level in the areas of finance and accounting, marketing, strategy, marketing, economics, enterprise, human resource management, project management, leadership and governance. The School is also a Chartered Institute of Procurement & Supply (CIPS) Centre of Excellence.

Students
The Business School has a student body of approximately 4,000 students, with students studying full-time, part-time, on-line, on-campus and off-campus at locations in Pontypridd, Cardiff, Newport, Merthyr Tydfil, and overseas.

Research
Following the publication of the results from the Research Assessment Exercise 2008, (RAE2008), where the Business School research was submitted, 5% was assessed as world leading, 10% as internationally excellent, 50% as recognised internationally and 35% recognised nationally. None was unclassified.

The six research centres at the University of South Wales Business School are led by academics in the fields of entrepreneurship and enterprise; work place bullying; leadership; marketing; organisational governance; creative supply chain thinking; public service management; organisational sustainability; business ethics; and creative organisational development.

 Centre for Research on Workplace Behaviours
 Welsh Enterprise Institute (WEI) Research Unit
 Welsh Research Unit for Governance and Leadership (WRUGL)
 Welsh Institute for Competitive Advantage
 Centre for Research on Consumption, Markets and Culture
 Centre for Research in Futures and Innovation

References

External links
Business School website
University of South Wales website

Business schools in Wales
Universities and colleges in Wales
University of South Wales